The Times-Tribune may refer to:
 The Times-Tribune (Corbin)
 The Scranton Times-Tribune